José León de Carranza Bridge (also referred to as the Carranza Bridge) is a 1400 m steel bridge that connects the city of Cádiz to the mainland. The bridge goes over the Bay of Cádiz. It forms part of the national network of roads with the number N-443. It is the older of the two bridges crossing to the city of Cádiz, the second being La Pepa Bridge to the north. This bridge is also one of the longest bascule bridges in Europe.

References 

Bridges in Andalusia
Road bridges in Spain
Buildings and structures in Cádiz